Vít Turtenwald (born 5 March 1980 in the Czech Republic) is a Czech footballer who plays for Heidenauer SV in Germany. Turtenwald played for several different teams around Europe, most notably for FK Teplice and FK Bohemians Prague in the Czech top flight.

Career
Turtenwald started his senior career with Viktoria Plzeň. In 2011, he signed for Tobol in the Kazakhstan Premier League, where ehe made sixteen league appearances and scored one goal. After that, he played for German club Heidenauer SV, where he now plays.

References

External links 
 Turtenwald v Kazachstánu: Úplatky i psí maso 
 Вит Туртенвалд: «Жена приходит болеть за меня во втором тайме»
 Противопожарный Вит 
 Блиц-интервью после матча 
 Vsechno nejlepsi k navozeninam, Вит! 
 V mém novém klubu je řád, žádný chaos, tvrdí Turtenwald 
 Strouhal a Turtenwald marně bojují o ligu 
 Czech Wikipedia Page 
 FuPa Profile 
 Futbalito Profile 
 iDNES.cz Profile

Expatriate footballers in Germany
Expatriate footballers in Slovakia
APEP FC players
FC Spartak Trnava players
Czech expatriate footballers
FK Bohemians Prague (Střížkov) players
Expatriate footballers in Kazakhstan
Expatriate footballers in Cyprus
Living people
1980 births
Czech footballers
FC Tobol players
FK Teplice players
FC Viktoria Plzeň players
Bohemians 1905 players
1. FK Příbram players
Association football defenders